Hessische/Niedersächsische Allgemeine (HNA) is a regional newspaper published in Kassel, Germany. Since 1 March 2017, the paper has been owned by Verlag Dierichs GmbH.

The average circulation of HNA in 2008 was 165,800 copies, having fallen from 247,500 copies in 1999.

References

External links
  

German-language newspapers
Newspapers published in Germany
Mass media in Kassel